The eighth season of Mad TV, an American sketch comedy series, originally aired in the United States on the Fox Network between September 14, 2002, and May 17, 2003.

Summary 
With fan-favorite cast members Alex Borstein, Will Sasso, and Andrew Daly gone, MADtv scrambled to find new talent to fill the void. Jill-Michele Meleán and Bobby Lee were upgraded to repertory status (though Meleán left in the middle of the season for undisclosed reasons). New faces in the cast for this season include: Ike Barinholtz, Simon Helberg (who only lasted a short time on this show, but is now more popular in his role on the sitcom The Big Bang Theory), Josh Meyers (younger brother of SNL cast member, Seth Meyers, making this the only time a Saturday Night Live cast member has had a family member be hired as a cast member on a competing sketch show), Christina Moore, Ron Pederson (who would become the show's second Canadian cast member after Will Sasso), and Paul Vogt (MADtv'''s only male homosexual cast member and the second cast member after season six's Nelson Ascencio to have an identical twin brother).

With Sasso gone, Frank Caliendo became the latest cast member to play George W. Bush. Newcomer Ron Pederson played Dick Clark, Woody Allen, Saddam Hussein, and Entertainment Tonight anchor Mark Steines. Vogt replaced Will Sasso James Lipton and impersonated classic sitcom stars, such as Edward Asner (The Mary Tyler Moore Show), Jackie Gleason (The Honeymooners), and Charlotte Rae (Diff'rent Strokes and The Facts Of Life). Like their counterparts Jimmy Fallon and Horatio Sanz on Saturday Night Live, long-time pals Ike Barinholtz and Josh Meyers would frequently appear in sketches together and play off each other's chemistry. Separately, Barinholtz performed celebrity impersonations such as Joe Millionaire's Evan Marriott and Nick Nolte, while Meyers offered offbeat impersonations of Eminem, Matthew McConaughey, Owen Wilson, Johnny Depp as Captain Jack Sparrow, Anna Nicole Smith's son, Daniel, and some *NSYNC members. In her short time on the show, Jill-Michele Meleán was known for her Drew Barrymore impression and her recurring turn as one of the Glamazon Huntresses.

Guests this season included: former In Living Color cast members Tommy Davidson and David Alan Grier; comic actor Fred Willard, That '70s Show cast members Mila Kunis, Danny Masterson, and Wilmer Valderrama; and former MADtv cast member, Nicole Sullivan.

 Opening montage 
The title sequence begins with the Mad TV logo appearing above the Los Angeles skyline. The theme song, performed by the hip-hop group Heavy D & the Boyz, begins and each repertory cast member is introduced alphabetically, followed by the featured cast. The screen dissolves into three live-action clips of an individual cast member. The three screens multiply until they occupy the entire screen. A shot of the cast member slightly moving appears on the screen with a caption of his/her name superimposed on it. When all cast members and guests are introduced, the music stops and the title sequence ends with the phrase "You are now watching Mad TV".

Cast

Repertory cast members
 Frank Caliendo  (23/25 episodes) 
 Mo Collins  (24/25 episodes) 
 Bobby Lee  (20/25 episodes) 
 Michael McDonald  (25/25 episodes) 
 Jill-Michele Meleán  (9/25 episodes; last episode: April 5, 2003)
 Aries Spears  (22/25 episodes) 
 Stephnie Weir  (25/25 episodes) 
 Debra Wilson  (25/25 episodes) 

Featured cast members
 Ike Barinholtz  (20/25 episodes) 
 Simon Helberg  (6/25 episodes) 
 Josh Meyers  (23/25 episodes) 
 Christina Moore  (8/25 episodes) 
 Ron Pederson  (15/25 episodes) 
 Paul Vogt  (12/25 episodes) 

Writers

Bryan Adams (eps. 1–25)
Ike Barinholtz (eps. 3, 17)
Dick Blasucci (eps. 1–25)
Kal Clarke (eps. 1–25)
Chris Cluess (eps. 1–25)
Steven Cragg (eps. 1–25)
John Crane (eps. 1–25)
Lauren Dombrowski (eps. 1–25)
Brian Hartt (ep. 20) (Season 05 Encore)
Michael Hitchcock (eps. 1–25)
Jennifer Joyce (eps. 1–25)
Bill Kelley (eps. 1–25)
Scott King (writing supervisor) (eps. 1–25)
Karen Maruyama (ep. 8)
Bruce McCoy (eps. 1–25)
Michael McDonald (eps. 2, 3, 5, 7–9, 14–16, 19–25)
Josh Meyers (eps. 3, 17)
Sultan Pepper (eps. 1–25)
Tami Sagher (eps. 1–25)
David Salzman (eps. 12–25)
Devon Shepard (ep. 23) (Season 06 Encore)
Dino Stamatopoulos (eps. 1–25)
Rich Talarico (eps. 1–25)
Bryan Tucker (ep. 24) (Season 07 Encore)
Stephnie Weir (eps. 2, 8, 9, 15–17, 19, 22)
Maiya Williams (eps. 1–25)
Jim Wise (eps. 1–25)

 Episodes 

 Home releases 
There is no season 8 complete season DVD release. However, this season's best sketches and segments have been used in the compilation DVD Mad TV: The Best of Seasons 8, 9, and 10''.

Season 8 is also available on HBO Max, with episodes 1, 2, 4, 5, 6, 7, 8, 9, 10, 11, 13, 16, 17, 20, 21, 22, and 23 missing.

External links 
 Mad TV - Official Website
 

08
2002 American television seasons
2003 American television seasons